Rhynchomitra is a genus of dictyopharid planthoppers in the family Dictyopharidae. There are about five described species in Rhynchomitra.

Species
These five species belong to the genus Rhynchomitra:

 Rhynchomitra cubanensis (Melichar, 1912) c g
 Rhynchomitra lingula (Van Duzee, 1908) c g b
 Rhynchomitra mexicana Fennah, 1944 c g
 Rhynchomitra microrhina (Walker, 1851) c g b
 Rhynchomitra recurva (Metcalf, 1923) c g b
Data sources: i = ITIS, c = Catalogue of Life, g = GBIF, b = Bugguide.net

References

Further reading

 
 
 
 
 

Auchenorrhyncha genera
Dictyopharinae